Basketball is an event at the Island Games, the biennial multi-sports event for island nations, territories and dependencies.

Basketball was first chosen as a sport at the Island Games in 1999.

Each Island can enter one team per gender. The minimum age is 13 on the opening day of the games.

Events

Top Medalists

Men's Results

Women's Results

References

 
Sports at the Island Games
Island Games